Carrick is a townland in County Westmeath, Ireland. The townland is located in the civil parish of the same name. The N52 motorway cuts through the middle of the townland, and Lough Ennell borders it to the west.

Carrick House 
Carrick house is an 18th Century country house, historically linked to the Fetherston-Haugh family. The house dates to c1740.

References 

Townlands of County Westmeath